Terror is an American hardcore band from Los Angeles, formed in 2002. The band has undergone several line-up changes, all overseen by founding members Scott Vogel (lead vocals) and Nick Jett (drums). Its current lineup also features guitarists Martin Stewart and Jordan Posner, as well as bassist Chris Linkovich. The band has released eight studio albums – the most recent of which, Pain Into Power, was released in May 2022. The band are noted as one of the most influential modern bands within beatdown hardcore and hardcore punk, with Stereogum describing Terror as "an institution within their genre".

History
Their debut album One with the Underdogs sold over 40,000 copies. They have toured throughout Europe, Australia, New Zealand, Japan, Korea, Mexico, and South America. Their sophomore album, Always the Hard Way reached No. 10 on Billboard Heatseekers and No. 19 on the Top Independent Records chart.

Before Terror, vocalist Scott Vogel sang for Slugfest, Despair, and for Buffalo, New York-based metalcore act Buried Alive in the mid-1990s. Drummer Nick Jett and ex-guitarist Todd Jones were members of the well-known hardcore band Carry On (who had releases on Bridge Nine and Teamwork Records). Richmond, Virginia's David Wood is well known as the vocalist of his hometown hardcore band Down to Nothing. Carl Schwartz, formerly of Sworn Vengeance, recorded much of Always the Hard Way after quitting the band to front First Blood full-time.

Vogel is widely known in the scene not just for his efforts to keep hardcore "pure" and "fun", but for his love of stagedives, and for his tendency for on-stage banter, known colloquially as "Vogelisms". Examples include "We need to elevate the maximum stagedive potential", "Take this shit to the next level", and "Maximum output! Activate the pit!".  Terror also participated in the first two years of the Sounds of the Underground tour.

Live by the Code, originally due out in 2012, was pushed back to April 2013, released by Victory Records on CD and by Reaper Records on vinyl. It was the band's first time charting on the Billboard 200, peaking at No. 121, selling 3,177 copies in its first week. It was also No. 1 on the Heatseekers chart and No. 28 on Independent Albums. A total of six music videos for tracks off of Live by the Code have been released: "Live by the Code", "The Most High", "I'm Only Stronger", "Hard Lessons", "Shot of Reality", and "Cold Truth".

On January 3, 2015, Terror were in the studio recording their sixth full-length album, The 25th Hour, set to be released on Victory Records. Pre-orders for The 25th Hour were announced on June 30, 2015, along with the albums August 7 release date and a stream for the single "The Solution" which premiered exclusively on Noisey.

Terror's seventh album, Total Retaliation, was released on September 28, 2018. This was followed in March 2021 by Trapped in a World, which saw the band re-record several songs from across their career live in-studio as part of what were billed the "Trapped in a World Sessions". These sessions saw the band reunite with founding guitarist Todd Jones, who oversaw production and contributed guitar parts. Jones retained this role for the band's eighth album Pain Into Power, which was released on May 6, 2022.

Members

Current
 Scott Vogel – vocals (2002–present)
 Nick Jett – drums (2002–present)
 Martin Stewart – guitar (2006–present)
 Jordan Posner – guitar (2009–present)
 Chris Linkovich – bass (2017–present)

Former
 Matt Smith – bass (2002)
 Eric Pressman – guitar (2002)
 Todd Jones – guitar (2002–2004)
 Doug Weber – guitar (2002–2009)
 Richard Thurston – bass (2002–2003)
 Carl Schwartz – bass (2003–2005)
 Frank Novinec – guitar (2004–2006)
 Jonathan Buske – bass (2005–2008)
 David Wood – bass (2009–2017)

Timeline

Discography

Studio albums

Live albums

Compilation albums

Demos

Extended plays

Split EPs

Music videos
 "Push It Away" (2003)
 "Keep Your Mouth Shut" (2004)
 "Overcome" (2005)
 "Always the Hard Way" (2006)
 "Lost" (2006)
 "Betrayer" (2008)
 "Never Alone" (2008)
 "Rise of the Poisoned Youth" (2009)
 "Stick Tight" (2010)
 "Keepers of the Faith" (2011)
 "Return to Strength" (2011)
 "You're Caught" (2011)
 "The New Blood" (2012)
 "Live by the Code" (2013)
 "I'm Only Stronger" (2013)
 "The Most High" (2013)
 "Hard Lessons" (2014)
 "Shot of Reality" (2014)
 "Cold Truth" (2014) 
 "Mind at War" (2015) 
 "Bad Signs" (2015)
 "Sick and Tired" (2015)
 "Kill 'Em Off" (2017)

References

External links

 Official website: totalretaliation.com
 

Hardcore punk groups from California
Heavy metal musical groups from California
Metalcore musical groups from California
Musical groups established in 2002
Century Media Records artists
Bridge 9 Records artists
2002 establishments in California
Deathwish Inc. artists
Pure Noise Records artists
Trustkill Records artists
Demons Run Amok Entertainment artists
Equal Vision Records artists
End Hits Records artists